Overprinting or overprint may refer to:
 Overprinting, a reprographics technique involving printing one color over another
 Overprinting (geology), the result of a geological process altering the marks of a previous process
 Overprinting (genetics), a process in which two genes are encoded by overlapping nucleotide sequences in different reading frames
 Overprint, an additional layer of text or graphics printed on stamps or currency

See also
 Overpainting